The coat of arms of the present-day German free state of Saxony shows a tenfold horizontally-partitioned (Barry of ten) field of black (sable) and gold/yellow (or) stripes, charged with a green (vert) crancelin (a stylized common rue) running from the viewer's top-left to bottom-right (in bend). Although the crancelin is sometimes shown bent (embowed) like a crown, this is due to artistic license. The coat of arms is also displayed on the state flag of Saxony.

History
The shield "Barry of ten sable and or, a crancelin vert" deduce from the Saxon counts of Ballenstedt (in present-day Saxony-Anhalt), ancestors of the ducal House of Ascania. The Ascanian margrave Albert the Bear achieved the Saxon ducal title in 1138; when his Welf successor Henry the Lion was deposed by Emperor Frederick Barbarossa in 1180, Albert's son Bernhard, Count of Anhalt received the remaining Saxon territories around Wittenberg and Lauenburg, and the ducal title. Legend goes that when he rode in front of the emperor, at the occasion of his investiture, carrying his escutcheon with the Ballenstedt coat of arms (barry sable and or), Barbarossa took the rue wreath he wore against the heat of the sun from his head, hanging it over Bernhard's shield and thus creating the Saxonian crancelin vert.

From about 1260, the Duchy of Saxe-Wittenberg emerged under the Ascanian duke Albert II, who adopted the tradition of the Saxon stem duchy and especially took over the Saxon electoral dignity, against the fierce protest of his Ascanian Saxe-Lauenburg cousins but confirmed by the Golden Bull of 1356. The Saxe-Wittenberg black and golden shield already displayed the Gothic crancelin, probably symbolizing the waiver of the Lauenburg lands. As the Ascanian Electors of Saxony also held the High office of an Arch-Marshal of the Holy Roman Empire, they added the ensign Per fess sable and argent two swords in saltire gules (the swords later featuring as the trademark of the Meissen china factory) to their coat of arms. When the line became extinct in 1422, the arms and electoral dignity were adopted by the Wettin margrave Frederick IV of Meissen.

When upon the German reunification the Free State of Saxony was re-established, the coat of arms was formally confirmed in 1991:

The Constitution of the Free State of Saxony adopted by the Landtag on 26 May 1992 stated the country flag displays in a ninefold partitioned field of Black and Gold a right diagonal green crancelin.

Galleries

Previous versions

Ernestine duchies

United Kingdom

Belgium

Bulgaria

Spain

Liechtenstein

Luxembourg

Nazi Germany

See also
Royal Arms of England
Coat of arms of Portugal
Coat of arms of Belgium
Coat of arms of Bulgaria

References

Saxony
Saxony
Culture of Saxony
Duchy of Saxony
Saxony
Saxony